Mapanna Mallikarjun Kharge (born 21 July 1942) is an Indian politician, who is the current president of the Indian National Congress, and Member of Parliament, Rajya Sabha from Karnataka since 16 February 2021. He became the first person outside the Nehru–Gandhi family to be the president of the party after 24 years. He previously served as Leader of the Opposition in Rajya Sabha from 16 February 2021 till 1 October 2022. He was formerly the Minister of Railways and Minister of Labour and Employment in the Government of India. Kharge was a Member of Parliament for Gulbarga, Karnataka from 2009 to 2019. 

He is a senior Karnataka politician and was the Leader of opposition in the Karnataka Legislative Assembly. He was the President of Karnataka Pradesh Congress Committee during the 2008 Karnataka State Assembly Elections.

He has won elections a record 10 consecutive times having won the Assembly elections an unprecedented 9 consecutive times (1972, 1978, 1983, 1985, 1989, 1994, 1999, 2004, 2008, 2009) . Mallikarjun Kharge was the leader of the Congress party in the Lok Sabha during 2014–2019. He defeated Shashi Tharoor in the 2022 Indian National Congress presidential election.

Early life and background
Mallikarjun Kharge was born in the Varawatti, Bhalki Taluk, Bidar district, Karnataka.

In 1948, Kharge lost his mother and sister in a fire set off by the Razakars or the private militia of the Nizam of Hyderabad, while he himself had a narrow escape at the age of 7. He finished his schooling from Nutan Vidyalaya in Gulbarga and went on to obtain a Bachelor of Arts degree from the Government College, Gulbarga and his law degree from the Seth Shankarlal Lahoti Law College in Gulbarga. He started his legal practice as a junior in Justice Shivaraj Patil's office and fought cases for labour unions early in his legal career.

Political career

Early career
Kharge started his political career as a student union leader while in the Government College, Gulbarga when he was elected as the General Secretary of the students' body. In 1969, he became the legal advisor to the MSK Mills Employees' Union. He was also an influential labour union leader of Samyukta Majdoor Sangha and led many agitations fighting for the rights of labourers. In 1969, he joined the Indian National Congress and became President of the Kalaburagi Town Congress Committee.

Rise in Karnataka's political scene
He first contested the Karnataka State Assembly elections in 1972 and won from Gurmitkal constituency. In 1973, he was appointed the Chairman of the Octroi Abolition Committee which went into the question of revitalising the economy of the municipal and civic bodies in the state of Karnataka. Based on its report, the then Devaraj Urs government abolished the levy of octroi at multiple points. In 1974, he was appointed the Chairman of state-owned Leather Development Corporation and worked to improve the living conditions of thousands of cobblers who were indulging in the leather tanning industry. Work sheds cum residences were built across the state for their benefit during this time. In 1976, he was appointed the Minister of State for Primary Education, during which time, over 16,000 backlog vacancies of SC/STs teachers were filled up by recruiting them directly into the service. Grants under grant-in-aid code were given to schools run by SC/ST managements for the first time.

In 1978, he was elected for the second time as MLA from Gurmitkal constituency and was appointed Minister of State for Rural Development and Panchayat Raj in the Devaraj Urs ministry. In 1980, he became the Minister for Revenue in the Gundu Rao Cabinet. During this time, the focus was on effective land reforms, resulting in giving occupancy rights to millions of land-less tillers and labourers. More than 400 land tribunals were constituted to expedite the transfer of land rights to the tillers. In 1983, he was elected for the third time to the Karnataka Assembly from Gurmitkal. In 1985, he was elected for the fourth time to the Karnataka Assembly from Gurmitkal and was appointed the Deputy Leader of the Opposition in the Karnataka Assembly.

In 1989, he was elected for the fifth time to the Karnataka Assembly from Gurmitkal. In 1990, he joined Bangarappa’s Cabinet as the Minister for Revenue, Rural Development and Panchayat Raj, portfolios he had held earlier and brought about significant change. Restarting the Land Reforms process that had stopped in the interim, resulted in hundreds of thousands of acres of land being registered in the name of the landless tillers.

Between 1992 and 1994, he was the Minister for Co-operation, Medium and Large Industries in the Veerappa Moily Cabinet. In 1994, he was elected for the sixth time to the Karnataka Assembly from Gurmitkal and became the Leader of the Opposition in the Assembly. In 1999, he was elected for the seventh time to the Karnataka Assembly and was a front-runner to the post of Chief Minister of Karnataka. He became Minister for Home in the S. M. Krishna Cabinet during a particularly trying time for Karnataka especially the Rajkumar kidnap by the notorious poacher Veerappan and the Cauvery Riots. In 2004, he was elected for the eighth consecutive time to the Karnataka Assembly and was once again considered a front-runner to the post of the Chief Minister of Karnataka. He became the Minister for Transport and Water Resources in the Dharam Singh-led coalition government.

In 2005, he was appointed the President of the Karnataka Pradesh Congress Committee. In the Panchayat elections held soon after, Congress won the largest number of seats compared to BJP and JD(S) indicating a revival of the Congress fortunes in the rural areas of Karnataka. In 2008, he was elected for the record ninth consecutive time to the Assembly from Chitapur. Though the Congress party put up a better show when compared to the 2004 elections, the Congress lost the elections with a majority of the senior leaders losing. He was appointed the Leader of the Opposition for the second time in 2008.

National politics
In 2009, Kharge contested the general elections from Gulbarga Parliamentary Constituency and won his tenth consecutive election.

In the 2014 general elections, Kharge contested and won from the Gulbarga parliamentary seat, beating Revunaik Belamagih from the BJP with a margin of 74,737 votes. In June, he was appointed the Leader of the Congress party in the Lok Sabha.

In the 2019 general elections, Kharge contested from the same parliamentary seat, however this time he lost to Dr. Umesh G. Jadhav from the BJP with a margin of 95,452 votes.

On 12 June 2020 Kharge was elected (unopposed) to the Rajya Sabha from Karnataka, at the age of 78 years. On 12 February 2021, Kharge was appointed Leader of Opposition, Rajya Sabha. 

Kharge notably has been appointed as an observer by the INC for multiple states in the past, including Assam in 2014, Punjab in 2021, and Rajasthan in 2022.  He has been criticized for his alleged inability to resolve internal party issues in these three states and therefore causing the loss in Assam and Punjab, and public embarrassment in Rajasthan. 

On October 1st 2022, he filed nominations to contest the INC party presidential polls.He was opposed by Shashi Tharoor and won with 7897 votes.  He was the first INC President not from the Gandhi family in 24 years.

Electoral performances

Positions held

Personal life 
Kharge married Radhabai on 13 May 1968 and has two daughters and three sons. Kharge is a polyglot, claiming to be fluent in English, Hindi, Urdu, Kannada and Marathi. His son Priyank Kharge is an MLA from the Chittapur assembly constituency.

He is the Founder-Chairman of Siddharth Vihar Trust that has built the Buddha Vihar in Gulbarga, India. He is also a patron of the Chowdiah Memorial Hall, a concert and theater venue in Bangalore. He helped the centre get over its debts and aided the centre's plans for renovation.

Controversies 
In November 2022, during the election campaign in Gujarat for Gujarat Assembly election, he termed Prime Minister Narendra Modi as Ravan in his speech. He said he has 100 heads like Ravan. After the speech, Bharatiya Janata Party demanded apologies from Kharge.

See also 
 List of presidents of the Indian National Congress
 Bangaru Laxman

References

|-

|-

|-

|-

|-

|-

|-

1942 births
India MPs 2009–2014
India MPs 2014–2019
Converts to Buddhism from Hinduism
Indian Buddhists
Indian National Congress politicians from Karnataka
Kannada people
Living people
Lok Sabha members from Karnataka
Members of the Cabinet of India
Labour ministers of India
People from Bidar district
People from Kalaburagi
Leaders of the Opposition in the Karnataka Legislative Assembly
Mysore MLAs 1972–1977
Members of the Mysore Legislature
Karnataka MLAs 1978–1983
Karnataka MLAs 1983–1985
Karnataka MLAs 1985–1989
Karnataka MLAs 1989–1994
Karnataka MLAs 1994–1999
Karnataka MLAs 1999–2004
Karnataka MLAs 2004–2007
Karnataka MLAs 2008–2013